Eye to Eye, Eye 2 Eye, or Eye II Eye may refer to:

Literature
Eye to Eye (novel), a 1997 young-adult novel by Catherine Jinks

Music
Eye to Eye (band), an American pop-rock duo with an eponymous 1982 album

Albums
Eye II Eye, by Scorpions, 1999
Eye 2 Eye (EP), by Casey Donovan, or the title song, 2007
Eye 2 Eye: Live in Madrid, by Alan Parsons, 2010

Songs
"Eye to Eye" (Chaka Khan song), 1985
"Eye to Eye" (Go West song), 1985
"Eye to Eye" (Taher Shah song), 2013
"Eye to Eye", by Blood Red Shoes from Get Tragic, 2019
"Eye to Eye", by Fates Warning from Parallels, 1991
"Eye to Eye", by Joan Jett from Pure and Simple, 1994
"Eye to Eye", by Ringo Starr from Ringo Rama, 2003
"Eye to Eye", by Sia from Music – Songs from and Inspired by the Motion Picture, 2021
"Eye 2 Eye", by Huncho Jack from Huncho Jack, Jack Huncho, 2017

Television
Eye to Eye (American TV series), a 1985 detective drama
Eye to Eye (British TV series), a 2011 business-themed interview programme
Eye to Eye (talk show), a 1988–1996 Philippine program
Eye to Eye with Connie Chung, a 1993–1995 American news show
Eye to Eye with Willie Jackson, a 2004–2009 New Zealand current events show
Eye to Eye, a 1950s British series; see Great Gable

See also
"I 2 I", a 1995 song by Tevin Campbell from the film A Goofy Movie